Silip is a 1985 Philippine sexploitation psychological drama film directed by Elwood Perez and written by Ricardo Lee. The film was released outside of the Philippines as Daughters of Eve.

Plot
In the remote countryside of Ilocos, various women are sexually abused by local men. Two sisters, Tonya (Maria Isabel Lopez), a sexually repressed young woman, and Selda (Sarsi Emmanuelle), a promiscuous woman, meet Simon (Mark Joseph), the most attractive man in the village. Tonya teaches catechism to the children of the village. Selda comes home from the city with her American lover, whom she throws out shortly afterward. She's the exact opposite of Tonya, as her views on sex are more liberal and less guilt-filled. Tonya is secretly sexually attracted to Simon, but she refuses his sexual advances.

Partial cast

Ma. Isabel Lopez as Tonya
Sarsi Emmanuelle as Selda 
Mark Joseph as Simon
Myra Manibog as Mona
Daren Craig Johnson as Ronald
Michael Locsin as Miguel (as Michael Angelo)
Arwin Rogelio as Tiago
Jenneelyn Gatbalite as Gloria
Pia Zabale as Pia
Jimmy Reyes as Village leader #1
Gloria Andrade as Aling Anda
Arthur Cassanova as Village leader #2 (as Arthur Casanova)
Chabeng Contreras as Tonya's grandma
Cheriebee Santos as Child #1 (as Cherriebee Santos)

Production
Sarsi Emmanuelle and Maria Isabel Lopez claimed that they had been almost raped for real while filming a scene in this movie. Sarsi reportedly suffered a nervous breakdown and had to be hospitalized for a week.

Release
First released in 1985, the film was released nationwide on February 7, 1986.

Home media
It was released on DVD by Mondo Macabro in 2007.  The region-one two-DVD set has soundtracks in both Tagalog and English. In 2021, the film was released on Blu-ray Disc with an additional commentary track.

Reception
Of the DVD release, Kurt Dahlke of DVD Talk noted that Silip: Daughters of Eve is an exploitation film, but "not your usual empty-headed sleaze show," and he remarked that viewers simply looking for a sexploitation film will not understand Silip.  He expands on this by writing, "Other reviewers have complained of the long, boring bits in between each scandalous act, completely missing the point," and he explains that unlike many films of its genre, Silip delivers its message "in small-scale epic fashion, with a lyric beauty that's hard to argue against. Using the desert-like scenery to maximum effect, nearly every shot is beautiful to look at, fostering a meditative, sweaty atmosphere that's truly unique." He goes on to praise the cinematography and the simultaneous themes that play out in the film and summarizes "While the women-are-the-root-of-all-evil message is ultimately distasteful, the truths exposed, and the path we're lead [sic] down in getting there, consists of quite a sumptuous, sensuous journey."

References

External links

1985 films
1985 drama films
1980s erotic films
1980s erotic drama films
1980s psychological drama films
Philippine drama films
Philippine erotic films
Philippine psychological drama films
Sexploitation films